Teaira McCowan (born September 28, 1996; first name pronounced  ) is an American professional basketball player for the Dallas Wings of the Women's National Basketball Association (WNBA) and for Galatasaray of the Women's Basketball Super League. She played college basketball for the Mississippi State Bulldogs.

College career
Following McCowan's junior season, she was named WBCA All-American, ESPNW First Team All-American and the Associated Press Third Team All-American. McCowan was also the inaugural winner of the Naismith Defensive Player of the Year Award.

On January 10, 2019, McCowan was the projected first overall pick in the 2019 WNBA draft in an ESPN mock draft. However, this particular mock draft included only college seniors and eligible international players. Later that month, ESPN compiled another mock draft, this time including draft-eligible juniors, the most notable of whom was Oregon's Sabrina Ionescu. In this second mock draft, McCowan was projected as third, but with the caveat that "if Ionescu decides to stay and play her senior season at Oregon, the whole first round looks different." This qualification proved relevant as Ionescu announced that she would remain at Oregon for 2019–20.

On January 21, 2019, she was voted as the espnW national player of the week.

Mississippi State statistics

Source

Professional career

WNBA
McCowan was drafted by the Indiana Fever with the third pick of the 2019 WNBA Draft. In her first game for the Fever, she hit a buzzer-beating layup to deliver an 81–80 victory. Following the 2019 season in which she averaged 10 points, 9 rebounds and 1.3 blocks per game, McCowan was named to the All-Rookie Team. She was second in the league in rebounding and scored a career-high 24 points in three games.

Overseas
On 1 August 2022, she signed with Galatasaray of the Turkish Women's Basketball Super League (TKBL).

WNBA career statistics

Regular season 

|-
| style="text-align:left;"| 2019
| style="text-align:left;"| Indiana
| 34 || 16 || 22.1 || .517 || .000 || .687 || 9.0 || 0.2 || 0.6 || 1.3 || 1.3 || 10.0
|-
| style="text-align:left;"| 2020
| style="text-align:left;"| Indiana
| 22 || 10 || 21.0 || .536 || .000 || .750 || 7.3 || 0.6 || 0.3 || 1.0 || 2.0 || 10.9
|-
| style="text-align:left;"| 2021
| style="text-align:left;"| Indiana
| 32 || 23 || 26.5 || .537 || .000 || .644 || 9.6 || 1.1 || 0.6 || 1.6 || 1.7 || 11.3
|-
| style="text-align:left;"| 2022
| style="text-align:left;"| Dallas
| 33 || 15 || 18.9 || 60.2 || N/A || .600 || 7.0 || 0.8 || 0.3 || 0.7 || 1.7 || 11
|-
| style="text-align:left;"| Career
| style="text-align:left;"| 4 years, 2 teams
| 121 || 64 ||22.2 || 54.9 || 0% || 0.661 || 8.3 || 0.7 || 0.5 || 1.1 || 1.6 || 10.8

Playoffs

|-
| style="text-align:left;"| 2022
| style="text-align:left;"| Dallas
| 3 || 1 || 24.7 || .480 || .000 || .533 || 9.3 || 1.0 || 0.3 || 1.7 || 3.3 || 10.7
|-
| style="text-align:left;"| Career
| style="text-align:left;"| 1 year, 1 team
| 3 || 1 || 24.7 || .480 || .000 || .533 || 9.3 || 1.0 || 0.3 || 1.7 || 3.3 || 10.7

Personal life
McCowan was born in Bryan, Texas and grew up in Brenham, Texas, where she graduated from Brenham High School. She is the daughter of Tracy Nunn and Dayronn McCowan.

References

1996 births
Living people
All-American college women's basketball players
American women's basketball players
Basketball players from Texas
Centers (basketball)
Dallas Wings players
Indiana Fever draft picks
Indiana Fever players
Mississippi State Bulldogs women's basketball players
Parade High School All-Americans (girls' basketball)
People from Brenham, Texas
Galatasaray S.K. (women's basketball) players